The electoral district of Carrum is an electoral district of the Victorian Legislative Assembly. 
It lies in the south eastern suburbs of Melbourne, covering Bangholme, Bonbeach, Carrum, Carrum Downs, Patterson Lakes, Sandhurst, Seaford and Skye.

The seat was created in 1976 and traditionally has had a working class character and has been safe for the Labor Party. However, since the 1990s the area has been gentrifying and the seat was won by the Liberal Party against the trend at the 1996 election. However, the seat was narrowly recovered by Labor due to the Anti-Kennett swing in 1999 and the 'Brackslide' of 2002 reverted the seat to its original safe Labor status.

The 2013 redistribution significantly reshaped the seat, with the seat losing Aspendale, Edithvale and parts of Chelsea to the seat of Mordialloc and gaining Carrum Downs and Sandhurst from the seat of Cranbourne.

In the 2014 Victorian State Election, Labor MP Sonya Kilkenny defeated the Liberal incumbent to regain the seat.

Members for Carrum

Election results

Graphical summary

References

External links
 Electorate profile: Carrum District, Victorian Electoral Commission

1976 establishments in Australia
Electoral districts of Victoria (Australia)
City of Kingston (Victoria)
City of Greater Dandenong
Electoral districts and divisions of Greater Melbourne